Penny Power OBE (born 1964) is a British author and speaker.

In 1998, she founded Ecademy with her husband Thomas Power and CEO Glenn Watkins with the aim of helping business people achieve success through online tools, community and friendship. As of May 2011, shortly before its demise, the Ecademy community had 3011 paying members [although Power claims a membership of 650,000. Penny Power published a book in August 2009, titled 'Know me, like me, follow me: what online social networking means for you and your business'. In 2012, Ecademy was acquired by SunZu, owned by Lyndon Wood.

Power was appointed Officer of the Order of the British Empire (OBE) in the 2014 New Year Honours for services to entrepreneurship in social and digital development.

References

External links 
  www.ecademy.com 
 www.pennypower.co.uk 

1964 births
Living people
Officers of the Order of the British Empire
British businesspeople